Mont Raimeux is a mountain of the Jura range, located on the border between the Swiss cantons of Jura and Berne. Reaching a height of 1,302 metres above sea level, it is the highest summit in the canton of Jura.

The summit of Mont Raimeux can be reached easily by several trails and a road culminating at 1,288 metres.

References

External links

Mont Raimeux on Hikr

Mountains of Switzerland
Highest points of Swiss cantons
Mountains of the canton of Bern
Mountains of the Jura
Bern–Jura border
Mountains of the canton of Jura
One-thousanders of Switzerland